The 1928–29 Cincinnati Bearcats men's basketball team represented the University of Cincinnati during the 1928–29 NCAA men's basketball season. The head coach was Frank Rice, coaching his first season with the Bearcats. The Bearcats repeated as Buckeye Athletic Association champions. The team finished with an overall record of 13–4.

Schedule

|-

References

Cincinnati Bearcats men's basketball seasons
Cincinnati
Cincinnati Bearcats men's basketball team
Cincinnati Bearcats men's basketball team